The 2021–22 season is the 123rd season in the existence of Cardiff City Football Club. In addition to the Championship, Cardiff City will participate in this season's editions of the FA Cup and the EFL Cup.

First-team squad

Statistics

Players with names in italics and marked * were on loan from another club for the whole of their season with Cardiff City.

|-
!colspan=15|Players out on loan:

|-
!colspan=15|Players who left the club during the season:

|}

Goals record

Assists record

Disciplinary record

Clean sheets
Includes all competitive matches. The list is sorted by squad number when total clean sheets are equal. Numbers in parentheses represent games where both goalkeepers participated and both kept a clean sheet; the number in parentheses is awarded to the goalkeeper who was substituted on, whilst a full clean sheet is awarded to the goalkeeper who was on the field at the start of play.

Contracts

Transfers

Transfers in

Loans in

Loans out

Transfers out

Pre-season friendlies
As part off Cardiff City's pre-season preparations, friendlies against Bath City, Cambridge United, Forest Green Rovers, Exeter City, Southampton and Newport County were announced.

Competitions

Overview

EFL Championship

League table

Results summary

Results by matchday

Matches
Cardiff City's fixtures were announced on 24 June 2021.

FA Cup

Cardiff were drawn at home to Preston North End in the third round.

EFL Cup

Cardiff City were drawn at home to Sutton United in the first round and Brighton & Hove Albion in the second round.

Summary

Club staff

Backroom staff

Board of directors

References

External links

Cardiff City F.C. seasons
Cardiff City
Cardiff City
Cardiff City F.C. 2021-22